Edmund Davis may refer to:

 Edmund J. Davis (1827–1883), American lawyer, soldier, and politician
 Edmund Francis Davis (1845–1889), English solicitor and businessman